The 1985–86 Divisional Championship was the third edition of the tournament launched by the Rugby Football Union to help prepare England players for test rugby and was contested across three weekends in December 1985.

The competition was revived after a gap of five seasons with the hope that it would provide a better standard of high level competition than the County Championship and allow the England team selectors to see players in evenly matched teams.

The Midlands Division won the tournament for the first time, winning all three of their games. London were second with two wins, followed by the North with one win and the South and South-West who lost all three of their games.

Results

References

Divisional Championship (rugby union)
Divisional Championship
Divisional Championship